Warta Tower is an office building in Wola, Warsaw, Poland.

Description 
The building was designed by Jerzy Czyż and Leszek Kazimierz Klajnert. It a 22-storey building and is 82 meters tall. It was in construction between 1998 and 2000. It is owned by TUiR Warta insurance company, which is where the name of the building comes from. The building is the headquarters of the company.

The building is almost completely glazed in dark blue glass. Lower floors of the buildings have panels of polished dark gray granite.

The lobby of the building contains a sculpture of Barbara Falender. The area of the courtyard is 1200m².

History
In March 2022 Globalworth, the owner of the building, offered space for 500 Ukrainian refugees under the SPACE FOR UKRAINE motto.

References 

Wola
Office buildings completed in 2000
Skyscrapers in Warsaw